A minute is a unit used to measure time.

Minute or minutes may also refer to:
Minute of arc, a unit used to measure angles
Minute (newspaper), a French far-right newspaper
Minute (basketball), a statistic in basketball
Minutes, the document in which the proceedings of a court or a meeting are recorded
Minutes (album), a 1984 album by Elkie Brooks
The Minutes, an Irish rock band
the minutes (album), a 2013 album by Alison Moyet
The Minutes (play), a 2017 play by Tracy Letts